Rookwood is a rural locality in the Shire of Mareeba, Queensland, Australia. In the  Rookwood had a population of 0 people.

Geography
Mungana is a neighbourhood in the east of the locality.
The Walsh River flows through from east to west. Muldiva Creek flows through from south-east to west, on its way to join the Walsh.

Road infrastructure
The Burke Developmental Road runs through from south-east to north-west.

History
In the  Rookwood had a population of 0 people.

References 

Shire of Mareeba
Localities in Queensland